Panki is a small village in Kendrapada district in the Indian state of Odisha.

Villages in Kendrapara district